Nathalie Marquay (born 17 March 1967 in Comines, Nord) was Miss France in 1987 and her country's representative at Miss Universe 1987 and Miss World 1987.

References

1967 births
La Ferme Célébrités participants
Living people
Miss France winners
Miss International 1988 delegates
Miss Universe 1987 contestants
Miss World 1987 delegates
People from Comines, Nord